Roxanne Joy Seeman is an American songwriter and lyricist. She is best known for her songs by Billie Hughes, Philip Bailey, Phil Collins, Earth, Wind & Fire, Barbra Streisand, Bette Midler, The Sisters of Mercy, The Jacksons, Jacky Cheung, and in film and television. She has two Emmy nominations.

Seeman is a writer and producer of the Japan Grand Prix Gold Disk Award for International Single of the Year "Welcome To The Edge" by Billie Hughes.

Seeman has written songs for Chinese artists including Jacky Cheung, Yang Kun, Super Vocal, Rainie Yang and productions by Zhang Yadong and Gao Xiaosong.

Seeman is a producer of the Broadway shows To Kill a Mockingbird and The Waverly Gallery.

Early life and education
Seeman was born in New York to Jewish parents, Murray Seeman, a lawyer and real estate developer, and his wife, Lee (née Sachs).  Her father was a scholar, World War II veteran, and former mayor of Great Neck Estates, where they lived. Of Czechoslavakian descent, thirty-three relatives of the Seeman family were killed in the Holocaust.

At age 10, Seeman pursued piano lessons. She took up violin at the Saddle Rock Elementary School and picked up guitar at 16.

During Seeman's high school years, she was an avid fine artist. Seeman attended Carnegie-Mellon University, Pittsburgh, Pennsylvania with the intention of pursuing a career in art. In the practice rooms of Carnegie-Mellon, Seeman found a piano teacher and studied classical piano.

At Carnegie-Mellon, Seeman was on the School Activities Board, booking bands to perform on campus. With a passion for jazz, Seeman attended a jazz theory class taught by Dr. Nathan Davis, Director of Jazz Studies at the University of Pittsburgh where she learned to play "Giant Steps", "Moment's Notice" and "Round Midnight".

Wishing to learn Chinese calligraphy, Seeman attended a class in Chinese language where she learned to write Chinese characters. This motivated Seeman to apply as a transfer student to Columbia University in New York, where she would pursue Asian Studies and be in the music world in New York City.

While on Long Island, Seeman studied piano with Tony Aless, jazz pianist who played with Woody Herman, Charlie Parker, among others. Seeman also took several lessons from Sir Roland Hanna.

Seeman is a graduate of Columbia University and Barnard College, with a B.A. in Oriental Studies, Chinese Arts and Language. She studied Chinese, Japanese and Indian literature, art, and took a class on Chinese music from Professor Chou Wen-Chung.

Career

Songwriting career 
Seeman spent nights in New York City jazz clubs while working as a temporary secretary at Atlantic Records and Warner Communications. In between jobs, while lying on a dock over the Long Island Sound in Kings Point, she was inspired to write lyrics for jazz instrumentals. In NY, she met David Lasley, a songwriter and session singer touring with James Taylor, who sang demos of her lyrics to the instrumentals.

Seeman relocated to Los Angeles in 1977 for a position at ABC Records, which was sold the next year to MCA Records. In 1979 Dee Dee Bridgewater recorded Seeman's lyric version of the Ramsey Lewis instrumental "Tequila Mockingbird", composed by Larry Dunn of Earth, Wind & Fire and produced by George Duke. This led to a collaboration with Philip Bailey of Earth, Wind & Fire, with whom she, Maurice White and Eddie del Barrio wrote "Sailaway", for Earth, Wind & Fire's Faces album.

During this time, she met Carmine Coppola and Italia Pennino and began a collaboration developing themes from Carmine's movie scores into songs, writing lyrics and producing song demos for the themes from The Black Stallion, The Outsiders, and Napoleon.

She began writing originals with David Lasley and other co-writers, producing 24-track recordings at ABC Recording Studios with David Benoit, Bobby Watson, Eduardo del Barrio, David Garibaldi, Doug Rodrigues, Terry Reid, Hubert Laws, Sylvia St. James, Arnold McCuller and ABC staff recording engineers Al Schmitt, Jr. and Zoli Osaze.

She met Gerry Brown, a young recording engineer and tape librarian at ABC.  He had mixed one of her songs and was listening so enthusiastically, she told him he could mix all of her songs.

While recording at ABC Recording Studios she met Jermaine Jackson and gave him a demo of the Eumir Deodato - Maurice White song Tahiti Hut, an instrumental with her lyrics sung by David Lasley.  Tahiti Hut was recorded during the Jermaine Jackson Switch sessions along with the track Reaching For Tomorrow, co-written with Paul Jackson, Jr and Seeman.  Reaching For Tomorrow became the title track and Tahiti Hut remained unreleased until issued as a bonus track on an Expanded Edition digital of the album in 2019.

In 1982, Seeman signed an exclusive writer agreement with Intersong Music, PolyGram Publishing. While under contract, she wrote “Walking On The Chinese Wall” with Billie Hughes, which her publisher turned down as too unusual, giving her back the song.

Seeman has maintained her own publishing company, Noa Noa Music, named after the Tahitian words "noa noa" (fragant scent) she used in a lyric.

Partnership with Billie Hughes
Seeman's partnership with recording artist and songwriter/composer Billie Hughes, began in 1983 until his death in 1998.

With Hughes, she wrote "Walking On The Chinese Wall" by Philip Bailey produced by Phil Collins, "If You'd Only Believe" by The Jacksons, "Night And Day" by Bette Midler, "Under The Gun" by The Sisters of Mercy and numerous songs by Billie Hughes in film and television.  

Together they wrote and produced Hughes' "Welcome to the Edge" which was nominated for an Emmy.  In the same year "Welcome To The Edge" was appearing as a love theme in the television show "Santa Barbara", it appeared as the theme song in the Japanese primetime television show "I'll Never Love You Again" (''もう誰も愛さない'') ("Mou Daremo Aisanai") .

"Welcome To The Edge" was a #1 single in Japan, remaining on the Billboard's Japan Top 10 chart for four months, selling 520,000 copies. It was also the title track of their album "Welcome To The Edge" by Billie Hughes.

Hughes performed "Welcome To The Edge at the NHK Japan Grand Prix Gold Disk Awards where they were up against MC Hammer in the best international single category.  Hughes received #1 International Single of the Year.

Seeman and Hughes were nominated for a second Emmy for their song "Dreamlove".

Walking on the Chinese Wall was included in Phil Collins' box set Plays Well with Others.

Working at Twentieth Century-Fox Films and casting 
Seeman held the position of Executive Assistant to Scott Rudin, President of Production for 20th Century Fox in the mid 1980s. In 1987, she worked on the film Off Limits, starring Willem Dafoe and Gregory Hines, on location in Bangkok and is credited for Thai casting.

Broadway producer
Roxanne Seeman & Jamie deRoy are co-producers of Scott Rudin's Broadway productions of "To Kill A Mockingbird" and "The Waverly Gallery". The nominees for the 73rd annual Tony Awards were announced on April 30, 2019, with 9 nominations for "To Kill A Mockingbird" and 2 nominations for "The Waverly Gallery" including Best Revival of A Play and Best Performance by a Leading Actress in a Play by Elaine May.

"The Waverly Gallery" won the Drama Desk Award for Outstanding Revival of A Play and the Drama League Award for Outstanding Revival of a Play. Elaine May won the Tony Award, Drama Desk Award, and Drama League Award for her performance.

Songwriting career 1998 to present 
In 1998, Seeman wrote the English lyrics "Come Back To Me" for "Gel Ey Seher", a poem by Fikret Goja that Polad Bülbüloğlu had composed the music for and had a hit with in the late 1960s. Paul Buckmaster was commissioned to write a new arrangement for Bulbuloglu, who had become Minister of Culture of Azerbaijan, to re-record and recommended her for an English version.

In 1999, Barbra Streisand released "Let's Start Right Now", an adaptation of the Brazilian song "Raios de Luz" with Roxanne Seeman's original English lyrics, recorded with a 72 piece orchestra arranged and conducted by Jorge Calandrelli. It was included as a bonus CD single in a limited edition of Streisand's A Love Like Ours album and as a bonus track on the international CD single release of Streisand's duet with Vince Gill.

In 2002, Seeman wrote English lyrics for Alejandro Sanz' Quisiera Ser onstage Grammy duet with Destiny's Child, performed in Spanish and English, with Beyoncé singing Seeman's English lyrics in the bridge.

In 2003, Jermaine Jackson performed "Let's Start Right Now" on The View.

Seeman participated in the 2003 Songwriters Summit at Henson Studios along with Lamont Dozier, K.C. Porter, and Narada Michael Walden, sponsored by the Oneness Organization whose goal was to inspire songs promoting social and racial unity.

For Sarah Brightman, Seeman wrote "Harem", original English lyrics for "Cancao do Mar", a Portuguese fado made famous by Amalia Rodrigues.  "Harem" was a dance club chart single, video and title of  Sarah Brightman's Harem album, which stayed in the Billboard Top 10 Crossover Classical chart for over 80 weeks.

In December 2008, Daniel Lindstrom, first Swedish Pop Idol winner, released "Caught In That Feeling", written by Seeman, Lindstrom, and Samsson, as the second single from his D-Day album.

In March 2009, Seeman and Philipp Steinke began a writing collaboration while Steinke, from Berlin, was in Los Angeles. In the same year, Alejandra Guzmán, Mexico's "Queen Of Rock", released "Amor En Suspenso (Crocodile Tears)", written by Seeman and Steinke with Spanish lyrics by Guzman and Fernando Osorio, on Guzman's Único album on EMI Latin.

Seeman and Steinke wrote "Everyday Is Christmas" and "Which Way, Robert Frost?" for Jacky Cheung's "Private Corner" album. Earth, Wind & Fire covered "Everyday is Christmas" on their "Holiday" album released in 2014. In 2016, Nils Landgren covered "Everyday Is Christmas" on his Christmas With My Friends V album.

Austrian blues-rock singer Saint Lu released "Falling For Your Love", written by Saint Lu, Seeman, and Jimmy Messer for Saint Lu's 2 album released in 2013. A live acoustic video of the song premiered on YouTube.

December 2015, Argentinian tenor Eduardo Bosio, recorded Seeman's lyrics "Part Of Me", adapting Beethoven's "Moonlight Sonata" into a new song.

June 2018, The Stanley Clarke Band released the album "The Message" with "Lost In A World", written by Stanley Clarke, Beka Gochiashvili, Cameron Graves, Mike Mitchell, Seeman, Skyeler Kole and Trevor Wesley.

Asia
In early 2009, Seeman began writing in LA for Jacky Cheung, China's "God of Songs", in collaboration with Andrew Tuason, producer, and Cheung, both in Hong Kong. Seeman wrote five songs: "Everyday Is Christmas", "Which Way, Robert Frost", "Let It Go", "Lucky In Love" and "Double Trouble" with German and Scandinavian co-writers in Europe, in a jazz style Cheung later coined "Canto-jazz". Four songs were adapted into Cantonese while "Everyday Is Christmas" he sings in English. When the album was finished, Cheung called it "Private Corner".

Cheung wanted to try a different style, jazz, for his new album which he called Private Corner, because Cheung says it is a personal expression, something he wanted to do for himself. The first song, "Everyday Is Christmas", Seeman co-wrote with Philipp Steinke.  Cheung liked "Everyday Is Christmas" so much, he asked Seeman and Steinke to write another song and they composed "Which Way, Robert Frost?".  Seeman continued to write songs for Cheung in the new  "Canto-jazz" style, a phrase Cheung coined to describe the music of his Private Corner album.  "不只有緣 (Lucky in Love)", "Double Trouble", "Let It Go", "Which Way, Robert Frost?",  and "Everyday Is Christmas", were co-written with European collaborators and all of the songs were adapted into Cantonese, except "Everyday Is Christmas".  Cheung said he tried having the lyrics for "Everyday Is Christmas" adapted into Cantonese, but he liked the meaning of the lyrics in English so much that he decided to record it in English.  Nokia's music download service website (Ovi.com) announced that "Everyday Is Christmas" was the 10th most downloaded Christmas song in the world in 2010, joining classic hits such as Wham's ‘Last Christmas’ and Mariah Carey's "All I Want for Christmas is You". Jacky is the only Chinese language singer to make it into the Top Ten.

In 2009, the newly formed South Korean girl group 4Minute with Kim Hyun-Ah of The Wonder Girls, recorded "Tick Tock".  When 4 Minute did not release "Tick Tock", it was recorded by Rainie Yang (Sony Taiwan) in Mandarin.  "Tick Tock (Rainie Yang song Qing Chun Dou)" by Rainie Yang was featured in the hit Taiwanese TV drama Hi My Sweetheart starring Rainie Yang and Show Lo. "Tick Tock" is co-written with Kine L. Fossheim and Olav Fossheim.

Following Seeman's trip to Asia in 2009, her songs were recorded by Rainie Yang, Jacky Cheung, Evan Yo, Allen Su, Amber Kuo, Yang Kun, Linda Chung, and Stephy Tang.

The Jacky Cheung 1/2 Century Tour opened at the Mercedes-Benz Arena, Shanghai on New Year's Eve 2011. Cheung's stage performance of "Double Trouble" featured a set built on the flip side of a 60-foot LCD screen, 25 musicians, 18 dancers, and a prop helicopter that he exited the stage from.

In 2011, Yang Kun recorded Seeman's "Hui Bu Hui (Will We)", co-written with Fredrik Samsson and Tobias Forsberg. It was produced by Zhang Yadong.  It is the theme song and promo music video for the Mainland China hit thriller "Lost in Panic Cruise".

In November 2011, Lin Yu-chun, a Taiwanese singer, who gained fame by appearing on a Taiwanese talent show One Million Star (超級星光大道) and singing "I Will Always Love You", released "Saving Grace", co-written by Seeman with Steinke and Finn Martin, on Lin's Endlessly album.

Seeman returned to Hong Kong in May 2012 for the finale concerts of Jacky Cheung's 1/2 Century Tour.  From there, Seeman went to Suzhou to meet Han Xue, who recorded "Lonely Kiss" for her album "They Said" released by Gold Typhoon in Mainland China. She  continued to Shanghai, then Beijing, where she met with Ai Dai, and on to Tokyo.

In 2013, Paolo Onesa, a contest of The Voice of the Philippines, released an English version of "不只有緣 (Lucky in Love)" as both a single and included in a compilation album from The Voice.  "Lucky In Love" and a new English language recording of "Which Way, Robert Frost" are included on Onesa's, Pop Goes Standards, released Valentine's Day, February 14, 2014.

Jason Dy, winner of The Voice of The Philippines (season 2) performed “Caught in that Feeling” live during the All Star Cast Finale Episode on March 7, 2015.  Dy recorded a new version of the song as the first single, released March 30, 2015, from his upcoming album release.

In August 2015,  "Which Way, Robert Frost?" received four nominations at the 28th AWIT Awards including Best Performance By A Male Recording Artist for Paolo Onesa.

On August 7, 2015, MCA Music Universal Philippines released Jason Dy's self-titled album "Jason Dy" with Seeman's songs "Caught in that Feeling", "Turn Out The Night" and "When You Hear This Song".

Zendee Rose Tenerefe, aka Zendee, a Filipina singer who rose to prominence after a video of her singing a karaoke version of Whitney Houston's "I Will Always Love You" was put on YouTube., recorded "When Love Calls Your Name" and "Watch This!".  Both tracks are included on Zendee's album "Z", released on August 7, 2015 by MCA Music Universal Philippines.

On September 22, 2016, Kyle Echarri, 13 year old contestant of The Voice Of The Philippines, season 2, released Seeman's song "Our Moment", co-written with Philip Doron Bailey, jr., Jens Hoy, and Rasmus Rudolph Soegaard.

On April 28, 2017, Edray Teodoro, contestant of The Voice Kids of The Philippines season 1 (2014), released her first EP, including Seeman's song "What You Doin' Tonight", co-written by Tinashe Sibanda and Melody Hernandez Noel.

On September 9, 2017, the Chinese version "久久真爱 (Forever True Love)" of Seeman's song "The Story of Us" was released as a theme song for Irene 9·9 International True Love Day Ceremony. The song was recorded by CARO Su Ai and produced by Gao Xiaosong.

On March 20, 2020, China's first male bel canto quartet, Super Vocal, performed "Qui Con Me (Ni De Se Cai 你的色彩)" (Your Colors) on the Hunan Television singing competition "Singer 2020", in both Italian and Chinese lyrics. The performance received more than 40 million views in 24 hours. The studio version single of "Ni De Se Cai" was released on March 27, 2020 by Decca China. “Ni De Se Cai” was composed by Seeman, George Komsky, and Ivo Moring with Italian lyrics “Qui Con Me" written by Saverio Principini, and Chinese lyrics “Ni De Se Cai" written by Cheng He. The song was produced by Nick Patrick and Wu Qinglong.

December 2020 Aarif Rahman (Aarif - chinese characters) released Won't You Be Mine by Li Zhiting, Daryl Wang, and Seeman.

Film and television
Seeman wrote "So Hard To Know" for Chet Baker,  appearing in Bruce Weber's Oscar-nominated documentary Let's Get Lost”.

The February 19, 1994, The Jackson Family Honors live ABC telecast from Las Vegas at the MGM Grand Hotel featured Seeman, Hughes and Jermaine Jackson's song "If You'd Only Believe" thematically, with a finale performance including Michael Jackson, guest artists Celine Dion and others. This song was also performed in concert one year earlier on March 15, 1993, by the Jacksons, composed of Jackie, Tito, Jermaine and Randy, on the stage of the Grand Théâtre de Genève for The Evening Of The Nations. Jermaine Jackson also performed this song alone, on January 14, 1990 in Atlanta, in tribute to Martin Luther King, during King Week 90 '.

"Welcome to the Edge" received an Emmy nomination for Best Original Song in the TV drama Santa Barbara in 1991. In 1994, Seeman and Hughes received a second Emmy nomination for Best Original Song for "Dreamlove" in the TV drama Another World.  In 1996, Seeman received Special Recognition for Musical Contribution, Daytime Drama Guiding Light, for her work with, and the Emmy awarded to, Music Director, Jonathan Firstenberg.

With Earth, Wind & Fire, Seeman co-wrote "Cruisin'" for Spike Lee's Get On The Bus. A collaboration with Eric Levi of ERA and Philip Bailey of Earth, Wind & Fire resulted in "People And Places", the end-title song of the French film La Vengeance d'une blonde.

Seeman co-wrote "Hold On To The Good Things" for Stuart Little 2, recorded by Grammy-winning artist Shawn Colvin. "Hold On To The Good Things" appears as the second end-credit song.

From William Ross' theme for The Young Black Stallion, Seeman and Gavin Greenaway developed and produced the song "Born To Ride" sung by Biana Tamimi, the 11-year-old actress from the film, for the DVD release December 2004.

Seeman co-wrote "不只有緣 (Lucky in Love)" with Daniel Nitt for Jacky Cheung. "不只有緣 (Lucky in Love)" appears over the end-credits of Crossing Hennessy, a Hong Kong movie produced by William Kong.  "Crossing Hennessy", starring Tang Wei (Lust, Caution) and Jacky Cheung, premiered as the opening night film for the 34th Hong Kong International Film Festival March 21. The track is produced by Andrew Tuason.

For Arif Mardin's All My Friends Are Here album and The Greatest Ears in Town: The Arif Mardin Story companion documentary, Seeman wrote lyrics for Mardin's composition So Blue. So Blue features Chaka Khan and David Sanborn.  The Greatest Ears In Town was screened during the 29th International Istanbul Film Festival in April 2010. All My Friends Are Here was released on June 15, 2010.  The Greatest Ears in Town: The Arif Mardin Story was nominated for a Grammy in 2011 for Best Long Form Video.

"Hui Bu Hui (Will We)", recorded by Mainland China recording artist and actor Yang Kun, appears as the theme song of Lost In Panic Cruise, the sequel to Lost In Panic Room.  The movie premiered on Mainland China October 27, 2011.  Yangkun, actor and singer, appears in the movie and the music video. Seeman's songs appeared in the 2012 Nickelodeon television series Hollywood Heights.

Seeman and Riccardo Cocciante wrote "When Love Calls Your Name" for The Voice of Italy finalist Elhaida Dani.  A videoclip of the recording session for "When Love Calls Your Name" by Elhaida Dani with Riccardo Cocciante, "Coach" (Judge") and producer, was posted at the Rai Television site, and the song was made available at iTunes Italy for voters.  During the May 30, 2013 finale show of The Voice of Italy, Elhaida Dani performed "When Love Calls Your Name".  When it was announced that Elhaida Dani wins as The Voice of Italy, Riccardo Cocciante joins Dani on stage and she sings, with Riccardo Cocciante alongside, an emotional reprise performance of "When Love Calls Your Name".

"Qing Chun Dou" by Rainie Yang appears in Netflix Marvel's Daredevil, season 2, episode 1.  "Qing Chun Dou" is the Mandarin language version of "Tick Tock (Beat The Clock)", written by Seeman - Ludvigsen - Fossheim.

Musical theatre
For Jambalaya, The Musical, Seeman and Kennard Ramsey wrote the song "Put It In The Pot", an all cast song performance. "Jambalaya, The Musical", written and directed by Nancy Gregory, premiered November 30 at The Orpheum Theatre, New Orleans, for a four night run with a three night return run on December 21, 2016 and showcase performances at the Jefferson Performing Arts Center in Metairie, Louisiana.

Veterans History Project 
As an advocate, for the Veterans History Project 20th Anniversary Event Celebration, Seeman contributed a song performance in tribute to Murray Seeman, World War II veteran, with an introduction to his collection of video interviews, photos, and letters being donated to the Library of Congress archives.  Pianist Elise Solberg accompanied Hannah Goldblatt singing "In Love And War" written by Seeman with Charles Fox.  The performance was filmed at Mack Sennett Studios, and live-streamed on November 7, 2020, from the Library of Congress, Washington, D.C.

On the weekend of Memorial Day 2021, Seeman appeared on The Jeremiah Show for a tribute episode with Solberg and Goldblatt to talk with about the making of their song performance of "In Love And War" for the Veterans History Project.

Film discography

Discography

International recordings

References

External links 
 
 
 Roxanne Seeman on IBDB
 
 If You'd Only Believe - Michael, The Jacksons, Celine Dion, at The Jackson Family Honors televised from the MGM Grand
 The Greatest Ears in Town: The Arif Mardin Story (EPK) on YouTube
 Chaka Khan - So Blue on YouTube

1954 births
Living people
Songwriters from New York (state)
Writers from New York City
Carnegie Mellon University College of Fine Arts alumni
American jazz songwriters
Jewish American songwriters
Songwriters from California
Columbia University alumni
Barnard College alumni
Jazz musicians from New York (state)
American lyricists
American women record producers